Alona Bondarenko was the defending champion, but chose not to participate this year due to a wrist injury.
6th seed Jarmila Groth won in the final 6–4, 6–3, against Bethanie Mattek-Sands.

Seeds

Draw

Finals

Top half

Bottom half

Qualifying

Seeds

Qualifiers

Draw

First qualifier

Second qualifier

Third qualifier

Fourth qualifier

References
 Main Draw

Singles 2011
Hobart International – Singles